Sara del Campo Yávar (31 December 1855 in Santiago – 30 August 1942 in Santiago) was First Lady of Chile from 1906 to 1910, and the wife of President Pedro Montt.

She was the daughter of Evaristo del Campo Madariaga and of Antonia Yávar Ruiz de Cabrera. She married Pedro Montt on January 3, 1881, but they had no descendants.

See also
Montt family

External links
Genealogical chart of Del Campo family 

1855 births
1927 deaths
Montt family
First ladies of Chile